The Duke of York Young Champions Trophy was an international golf tournament for boys and girls who were either the current holders of their under-18 National Championship or had won another major golfing event in the preceding twelve months. First played in 2001, the event was supported by The R&A and their affiliated national governing bodies and counts towards the World Amateur Golf Rankings and the American Junior Golf Association's performance based entry system. It had a 54-hole stroke play format.

History 
The event was created by The Duke of York and John Simpson. This highly rated invitational event, supported by The R&A, and aims to promote the development of junior golf, encourage competitiveness and friendship between individual champions whilst also offering a unique opportunity for boys and girls to compete for the same Trophy on a top quality UK links course.  The standard of competition continues to be incredibly high with the average handicap for last year's event being an impressive +1.5.

The tournament has grown from having just 11 competitors from six countries in 2001, to a field of 55 champions from 32 countries in 2013. 
The Duke of York Young Champions Trophy is organised in many ways like a professional tournament in order to give the potential stars of the future a chance to experience what life as a golf professional might involve; hence the inclusion of sponsors and official functions, including the Official Dinner hosted by the Duke of York, as well as an educational talk. Past players include Rory McIlroy, Anna Nordqvist, Matteo Manassero and Tom Lewis.

The tournament was wound up in 2020 when the Prince Andrew Charitable Trust ceased operations following the Jeffrey Epstein scandal.

Academic and golf scholarships 
The Duke of York Sports Foundation is a registered charity established in 2004 to promote amateur sports. Academic and golf scholarships have been awarded since September 2007 to provide under 18 boys and girls with the opportunity to receive a high standard of education whilst at the same time focusing on their golf and offer an alternative to studying and training in the USA.

Wellington College in Berkshire was chosen as the school that met all the criteria required to support both aspects of the scholarship. As one of the best co-educational independent private schools in Britain, it offers the International Baccalaureate, a good standard 9-hole golf course and practice facilities on site. It is also located near many excellent courses (including Wentworth and Sunningdale), coaches and major airports.

Candidates must meet Wellington College's academic standard, demonstrate a high level of golfing ability with clear signs of potential and are selected on a case-by-case basis. To date, the Foundation has awarded five academic and golf scholarships. All the scholars are aged between 14 and 17, with handicaps ranging from three to plus-two. The Foundation's aim is to award eight to ten scholarships to individuals by 2011.

Champions 

* Due to fog and poor visibility, the 2014 competition was reduced to 36 holes.

Courses 

The Duke of York Young Champions Trophy used to be held at links courses across the UK. Dundonald Links and Royal Liverpool played host to the tournament four times.

Participating countries
As of 2014, 50 countries have participated in the Duke of York Young Champions Trophy.

Notable past players 
Rory McIlroy: winner of the 2011 U.S. Open, the 2012 and 2014 PGA Championship and the 2014 Open Championship
Ariya Jutanugarn: winner of the 2016 Women's British Open and the 2018 U.S. Women's Open
Anna Nordqvist: winner of the 2009 LPGA Championship
Matteo Manassero: winner of the 2009 British Amateur and the 2013 BMW PGA Championship
Melissa Reid: winner of six Ladies European Tour events
Pablo Martín: winner of three European Tour events, first amateur ever to win a European Tour event.
Carly Booth: winner of two Ladies European Tour events
Oliver Fisher: youngest ever Walker Cup player in 2005
Tom Lewis: Silver Medal winner at the 2011 Open Championship
Laetitia Beck:  Israeli champion, and gold medal winner in the 2009 and 2013 Maccabiah Games.

References

External links 
Duke of York Young Champions Trophy Official Website

Junior golf tournaments
Golf tournaments in the United Kingdom